Miroslav Rede (born 1938) is a Croatian sports journalist and former football player.

Playing career
He started playing in one of the biggest Yugoslav clubs, Belgrade's FK Partizan. In 1959 he moved, together with his family, to Zagreb, and he started playing for another Yugoslav giants, this time NK Dinamo Zagreb. After two seasons there, he returned to Belgrade and played one year with FK Rad before signing, in 1962, with NK Lokomotiva Zagreb where he will play the rest of his career, until 1967.

Sports journalism
After retiring, in 1967, he started working as sports journalist in Zagreb's Sportske novosti as a football section editor. At same time, he becomes also the main football editor at the weekly SN Revija magazine. For one year he was the Sports Director of the Croatian First League club NK Inker Zaprešić, but in 1993 he returns to journalism, this time to work in the Croatian daily newspaper Večernji list where he stayed until 2002.

For his work in journalism, he received an award for his life-time work from the Croatian Association of Sports Journalists, and the special journalist award for his coverage of the 1978 FIFA World Cup.

External links
 Life story at Nogometni leksikon. 

1938 births
Sportspeople from Kikinda
Croatian sports journalists
Yugoslav footballers
Association football forwards
FK Partizan players
GNK Dinamo Zagreb players
FK Rad players
NK Lokomotiva Zagreb players
Living people